The Projector is a Singaporean independent cinema founded in 2014 in Singapore, specializing in arts-house films.

It has two locations, including one at the Golden Mile Tower and one at Riverside Point.

History 

The Projector was founded in 2014 by Karen Tan, Sharon Tan and Blaise Trigg-Smith, under their company Pocket Projects. Sharon Tan was the general manager.

The venue was originally founded as Golden Theatre in 1973, the biggest cinema at the time in Singapore and Malaysia, with a single hall that sat up to 1,500 people. In 1990s, the venue was split into 3 halls. Eventually in 2014, Golden Theatre retained the largest 1,000-seats hall, while The Projector took over the smaller halls.

In 2019, Sharon Tan left the cinema and Prashant Somosundram took over as general manager.

During the COVID-19 Pandemic, they paused operations from 31 May to 13 June 2021 across all theaters, due to tough business conditions caused by new COVID-19 containment measures in Singapore.

In July 2020, they launched Projector Plus, an online movies on-demand streaming platform.

In 2022, after Mm2 Entertainment stopped the operations of the Cathay Cineplex at The Cathay, the Projector leased its location as a pop-up cinema, Projector X: Picturehouse, from 23 August onwards. Picturehouse consisted of four halls, including the former 590-seater Cathay Grand.

Locations

Golden Mile Tower 
The Golden Mile Tower outlet was launched in April 2014. It began with an appeal on crowdfunding site Indiegogo, which raised US$55,000. It currently has three screens: Green Room, a 230-seat hall, Redrum, a 200-seat hall, and Blue Room, a 100-seat hall. The later was originally a church, before being converted into a cinema hall.

Riverside Point 

The Riverside Point outlet, known as Projector X, was launched on 30 April 2021. It currently has one screen with 48 seats. The venue, which was formerly a Chinese nightclub, had the former changing rooms turned into art installation by Marc Nair. Before that, it had been used for Studio City Cinemas, in the 1990s. The outlet is planned as a pop-up cinema and will open only till end 2022.

The Cathay 
On 23 August 2022, The Projector took over four halls, including the former 590-seater Cathay Grand, of the Cathay Cineplex at The Cathay as a pop-up cinema, Projector X: Picturehouse.

References

External links

Cinema chains in Singapore
Singaporean brands
2014 establishments in Singapore